Willow Springs Center  is a residential psychiatric hospital for children located in Reno, Nevada.

Overview
First opened in 1988, Willow Springs Center is owned and operated by a subsidiary of Universal Health Services. Residents live in a secured dormitory setting with a 116-bed capacity.

Certification
Willow Springs Center is fully accredited by the Joint Commission on Accreditation of Healthcare Organization and licensed by the State of Nevada as a psychiatric hospital for juveniles between the ages of 12 to 17.

References

External links 

 Official site

Psychiatric hospitals in Nevada
Hospital buildings completed in 1988
1988 establishments in Nevada